The 2014–15 season was AFC Bournemouth's 2nd season in the Football League Championship following their promotion from Football League One in 2013.

On 25 October 2014 Bournemouth won 8–0 away at St. Andrew's against Birmingham City. It was the first time that the Cherries had ever scored eight goals in a league game (barring a 10–0 win over Northampton Town in September 1939 which was expunged from the records after World War II broke out the next day) and they recorded their biggest winning margin in a league fixture. This season will be remembered as Bournemouth's greatest ever season. They won promotion to the Premier League, and promotion to England's top division, for the first time in their history by winning the Championship on 2 May 2015.

Statistics

Appearances & goals

|-
!colspan=14|Players currently out on loan:

|}

Goalscorers

Disciplinary record

Competition

Pre-season and friendlies

Championship

League table

League results summary

Matches

The fixtures for the 2014–15 season were announced on 18 June 2014 at 9am.

FA Cup

League Cup

The draw for the first round was made on 17 June 2014 at 10am. Bournemouth were drawn away to Exeter City.

Transfers

In

Out

Loans in

Loans out

References

External links
 A.F.C. Bournemouth Official Site

2014-15
AFC Bournemouth